Snowking Mountain is a  summit located in Skagit County of Washington state. Situated within the Glacier Peak Wilderness, Snowking Mountain is positioned west of the crest of the North Cascades Range, approximately 18 miles northeast of the town of Darrington. It is set within the Glacier Peak Wilderness, on land managed by Mount Baker–Snoqualmie National Forest. Snowking has two subsidiary peaks, West Peak (7425 ft), and Middle Peak (7400 ft).  A broad unnamed glacier known colloquially as Snowking Glacier rests on the north face. Downslope of that glacier are Snowking Lake, Found Lake, and Cyclone Lake. Mount Tommy Thompson is three miles to the northwest, and the nearest higher neighbor is Mount Misch,  to the southeast. Precipitation runoff from Snowking Mountain drains into tributaries of the Skagit River.

Climate
Snowking Mountain is located in the marine west coast climate zone of western North America. Most weather fronts originate in the Pacific Ocean, and travel northeast toward the Cascade Mountains. As fronts approach the North Cascades, they are forced upward by the peaks of the Cascade Range (Orographic lift), causing them to drop their moisture in the form of rain or snowfall onto the Cascades. As a result, the west side of the North Cascades experiences high precipitation, especially during the winter months in the form of snowfall. During winter months, weather is usually cloudy, but, due to high pressure systems over the Pacific Ocean that intensify during summer months, there is often little or no cloud cover during the summer. Because of maritime influence, snow tends to be wet and heavy, resulting in high avalanche danger.

Geology
The North Cascades features some of the most rugged topography in the Cascade Range with craggy peaks and ridges, deep glacial valleys, and granite spires. Geological events occurring many years ago created the diverse topography and drastic elevation changes over the Cascade Range leading to the various climate differences.

The history of the formation of the Cascade Mountains dates back millions of years ago to the late Eocene Epoch. With the North American Plate overriding the Pacific Plate, episodes of volcanic igneous activity persisted.  In addition, small fragments of the oceanic and continental lithosphere called terranes created the North Cascades about 50 million years ago.

During the Pleistocene period dating back over two million years ago, glaciation advancing and retreating repeatedly scoured the landscape leaving deposits of rock debris. The “U”-shaped cross section of the river valleys are a result of recent glaciation. Uplift and faulting in combination with glaciation have been the dominant processes which have created the tall peaks and deep valleys of the North Cascades area.

References

External links

 Weather forecast: Snowking Mountain
Glacier Peak Wilderness (Mt. Baker-Snoqualmie National Forest) U.S. Forest Service 
 Snowking aerial photo: PBase
 Climbing Snowking: YouTube

Cascade Range
North Cascades
Mountains of Washington (state)
Mountains of Skagit County, Washington
North Cascades of Washington (state)
North American 2000 m summits